Carl Alfred Pedersen (5 May 1882 – 25 June 1960) was a Norwegian gymnast and triple jumper who competed in the Summer Olympics in 1906, 1908 and 1912.

At the 1906 Intercalated Games in Athens, he was a member of the Norwegian team, which won the gold medal in the gymnastics team event. He also participated in the triple jump competition and finished eighth.

In 1908 he won a silver medal in the gymnastics team event with the Norwegian team. In 1912, again as a member of the Norwegian team, he won a bronze medal in the gymnastics team, Swedish system event.

In national athletics he became Norwegian champion in high jump in 1904, 1905 and 1907, and in long jump in 1905, but never in triple jump. He represented Ørnulf IF in Kristiania.

References
 Database Olympics profile

1882 births
1960 deaths
Norwegian male triple jumpers
Norwegian male artistic gymnasts
Athletes (track and field) at the 1906 Intercalated Games
Olympic athletes of Norway
Olympic gymnasts of Norway
Olympic gold medalists for Norway
Olympic silver medalists for Norway
Olympic bronze medalists for Norway
Olympic medalists in gymnastics
Medalists at the 1906 Intercalated Games
Medalists at the 1908 Summer Olympics
Medalists at the 1912 Summer Olympics
Gymnasts at the 1906 Intercalated Games
Gymnasts at the 1908 Summer Olympics
Gymnasts at the 1912 Summer Olympics